There are 175 species of fish in Ethiopia. Forty of these species are endemic found only in Ethiopia.

Fish found in Ethiopia:

Alestes baremoze 	
Alestes dentex 	
Amphilius lampei  	
Andersonia leptura  
Aphanius dispar dispar  	
Aplocheilichthys antinorii 
Aplocheilichthys jeanneli  
Aplocheilichthys rudolfianus  
Auchenoglanis biscutatus  
Auchenoglanis occidentalis 
Awaous aeneofuscus  	
Bagrus bajad  	
Bagrus docmak  	 
Bagrus urostigma  	 
Barbus anema  		 	 
Barbus arambourgi  		 	 
Barbus bynni bynni  		 	 
Barbus ethiopicus  		 	 
Barbus gananensis  		 	 
Barbus humilis  	 	 	 
Barbus kerstenii 	 
Barbus microterolepis  	 
Barbus neglectus  		 	 
Barbus osseensis  		 	 
Barbus paludinosus 	
Barbus perince  	 	 
Barbus pleurogramma  	 	 
Barbus pumilus  		 	 
Barbus stigmatopygus  		 	 
Barbus tanapelagius  		 
Barbus trispilopleura  		 	 
Brienomyrus niger  
Brycinus affinis  	 
Brycinus macrolepidotus   
Brycinus nurse  	 
Carassius auratus auratus 	
Carassius carassius  	
Chelaethiops bibie  		 
Chiloglanis modjensis 	 	 
Chiloglanis niloticus  	 
Chrysichthys auratus  	 	 
Citharinus citharus citharus  	 
Citharinus latus   	 
Clarias anguillaris  	
Clarias gariepinus  	
Cromeria nilotica  	
Ctenopharyngodon idella  	 
Ctenopoma muriei   
Cyprinus carpio carpio  	
Danakilia franchettii  		 
Distichodus brevipinnis  	 	 
Distichodus engycephalus   
Distichodus niloticus  
Distichodus rostratus  
Epiplatys spilargyreius 	
Esox lucius  	
Gambusia holbrooki  
Garra aethiopica  		 	
Garra blanfordii
Garra dembecha
Garra dembeensis
Garra duobarbis
Garra ethelwynnae
Garra geba
Garra ignestii
Garra makiensis
Garra quadrimaculata
Garra regressus
Garra tana
Gymnarchus niloticus
Haplochromis macconneli
Haplochromis rudolfianus
Haplochromis turkanae
Hemichromis fasciatus
Hemichromis letourneuxi
Heterobranchus bidorsalis
Heterobranchus longifilis
Heterotis niloticus
Hippopotamyrus pictus
Hydrocynus brevis
Hydrocynus forskahlii
Hydrocynus vittatus
Hyperopisus bebe bebe
Hypophthalmichthys molitrix
Ichthyborus besse besse
Labeo bottegi
Labeo boulengeri
Labeo brunellii
Labeo coubie
Labeo cylindricus
Labeo forskalii
Labeo horie
Labeo niloticus
Labeo pellegrini
Labeobarbus acutirostris
Labeobarbus brevicephalus
Labeobarbus crassibarbis
Labeobarbus dainellii
Labeobarbus gorgorensis
Labeobarbus gorguari
Labeobarbus intermedius intermedius
Labeobarbus longissimus
Labeobarbus macrophtalmus
Labeobarbus megastoma
Labeobarbus nedgia
Labeobarbus platydorsus
Labeobarbus surkis
Labeobarbus truttiformis
Labeobarbus tsanensis
Lates longispinis
Lates niloticus
Lebias stiassnyae
Leptocypris niloticus
Malapterurus electricus
Malapterurus minjiriya
Marcusenius annamariae
Marcusenius cyprinoides
Micralestes elongatus
Mochokus niloticus
Mormyrops anguilloides
Mormyrus caschive
Mormyrus hasselquistii
Mormyrus kannume
Mormyrus longirostris
Nannaethiops bleheri
Nemacheilus abyssinicus
Neobola bottegoi
Neobola stellae
Neolebias trewavasae
Nothobranchius cyaneus
Nothobranchius jubbi
Nothobranchius microlepis
Nothobranchius patrizii
Oncorhynchus mykiss
Oreochromis niloticus cancellatus
Oreochromis niloticus filoa
Oreochromis niloticus niloticus
Oreochromis niloticus tana
Oreochromis niloticus vulcani
Oreochromis spilurus niger
Oreochromis spilurus spilurus
Parachanna obscura
Petrocephalus bane bane
Petrocephalus bovei bovei
Pollimyrus isidori isidori
Pollimyrus petherici
Polypterus bichir bichir
Polypterus endlicheri endlicheri
Polypterus senegalus senegalus
Protopterus aethiopicus aethiopicus
Raiamas senegalensis
Salmo trutta trutta
Sarotherodon galilaeus galilaeus
Schilbe intermedius
Schilbe mystus
Schilbe uranoscopus
Siluranodon auritus
Synodontis batensoda
Synodontis caudovittata
Synodontis clarias
Synodontis eupterus
Synodontis filamentosa
Synodontis frontosa
Synodontis geledensis
Synodontis membranacea
Synodontis nigrita
Synodontis punctulatus
Synodontis schall
Synodontis serrata
Synodontis sorex
Tetraodon lineatus
Tilapia rendalli
Tilapia zillii
Varicorhinus beso
Varicorhinus jubae

There have been attempts to introduce species of fish in crater lakes that are isolated from the rivers of Ethiopia, successful at Babogaya just outside Debre Zeyit (Bishoftu) and unsuccessful at Burree Waqa near Meti.

References

'
Ethiopia
Fish